9 Lives is the debut studio album by American singer Kat DeLuna. It was released in the United States on August 7, 2007. The album is a mix of R&B, pop, latin and dancehall influences. The album is mainly produced by RedOne, who at the time was unknown. Many of the songs on the album have a Hispanic feel, mainly the track Am I Dreaming. The album features guest appearances by artists such as Shaka Dee, Don Omar, Elephant Man and American rapper Busta Rhymes. DeLuna would later collaborate with Elephant Man yet again on her 2010 album, Inside Out.

9 Lives saw the release of three singles. The first of these, "Whine Up" featuring Elephant Man serving as a guest vocals, and has become DeLuna's biggest hit to date. It is, so far, her only single to chart on the Billboard Hot 100 in the US, where it peaked at number 29. In that country, the song became a smash hit over the Summer, topping the Hot Dance Club Play chart, as well as receiving heavy airplay on radio stations. It was also met with success in countries foreign to DeLuna, reaching the top 10 in France and Belgium. The single also had a large amount of success in countries such as Germany and Australia, peaking inside the Top 20 of both countries.

"Run the Show" was released as the second official single. The US version featured rapper Busta Rhymes, however, the international version featured Don Omar instead. The single has become one of DeLuna's highest charting singles, as well as her first to enter the charts in the United Kingdom. Although it failed to chart on the Hot 100 in the United States, the single proved to be a big dance hit, peaking at number 2 on the Hot Dance Club Play chart. The final single from the album was "In the End", which was only released in certain territories, excluding the US and UK.

The album was a commercial failure in the United States. When it debuted at number 58 on the US Billboard 200, selling 11,000 copies in its first week. Since its release, the album has nearly sold 200,000 copies to date. It served better in foreign countries, however, it has reached on the top 20 in Belgium, Poland and Finland. In France, the album reached a peak of number 26, and later received a silver certification in the country.

Background
At age 15, DeLuna entered a Coca-Cola sponsored karaoke competition. Her version of "I Will Always Love You" took first place. It was through this competition that she met Cuban salsa singer Rey Ruiz. Ruiz gave DeLuna this advice: "Nobody knows you better than you do, and nobody can help you if you can't help yourself." DeLuna began writing her own music and has continued to do so. In 2004, while DeLuna was 17, Coquette opened for a Cassidy concert in New Jersey. In 2006, DeLuna chose to pursue a solo career and was signed by Epic Records. After signing with the label, DeLuna met with producer RedOne, and the two would later collaborate on the majority of the album's tracks. DeLuna also met rapper Don Omar, who lent his vocals to the track, Run the Show. Shaka Dee and Busta Rhymes also collaborated on Run the Show, with the Don Omar version being released in the European edition of the album, the Shaka Dee version being released in Spanish territories, and the Busta Rhymes version being released in the United States. DeLuna also teamed up with Elephant Man on the track Whine Up, which received a worldwide release. The Konvict Musik Edition of the album also features Akon on the song, Am I Dreaming, which was originally performed as a solo song by DeLuna.

Composition
The music found on the album is generally R&B and pop as well as dancehall, latin and hip hop. Throughout the album, Spanish influences are seen in the majority of the tracks. The album opens up with an intro, before proceeding into the next song. Following the intro is the album's second single, Run the Show. The version on the original release of the album features DeLuna singing the song by herself, however, there are multiple versions of the song which were released in various countries. The track sees DeLuna singing about commanding the dance floor. The following song is Am I Dreaming, which was initially going to be the album's second single. The song differs greatly from the dance nature of the previous track, with a more tropical beat taking over the song. The song sees DeLuna asking herself if she is dreaming, because the person she loves is so perfect. The fourth track on the album is the lead single, Whine Up. The dancehall track has DeLuna singing about a dance move, called the whine up. Both the album version and single version feature Elephant Man rapping a verse on the track. The fifth track on the album is Feel What I Feel. The song is more similar to Am I Dreaming, in the sense that both feature a soothing tropical melody. The track is mid-tempo, being one of the slowest songs on the album. Love Me or Leave Me is the sixth song on the album. The pop-ballad features DeLuna singing over a piano based beat, speaking of how one of the best to happen in her life was her ex leaving her.

The seventh song on the album is In the End, which also serves as the album's third and final single in certain European countries. The beat of the song is more edgy, featuring a guitar in the background. The track speaks of DeLuna having nothing left except for the one that she loves. Love Confusion is the eighth track on the album. The song has a trance-like beat, as DeLuna sings about being confused by the love she feels for someone. Animal serves as the ninth track on the album. The song is similar in tune to Whine Up, however, features heavy Spanish influence. Be Remembered, the tenth song on the album, features Shaka Dee on guest vocals. The mid-tempo dance track also sees DeLuna showing off her vocal skills. The song mainly speaks of everyone having their chance to shine, and be remembered. Enjoy Saying Goodbye is the eleventh song on the album, and final English song. The song begins as a ballad, however, slowly transitions into a more upbeat dance track. The final three tracks on the album are all Spanish versions of previously heard songs. The Spanish version of Whine Up is the twelfth song on the album, and is followed by Como Un Sueño, translating to Am I Dreaming in English. The fourteenth and final track is the Spanish version of Run the Show.

Release
After the success of 9 Lives lead single, Whine Up, the album was quickly rushed for release. The album was first released in the United States and Canada, where it simultaneously was released on August 7, 2007 by Epic Records and Sony Music Entertainment. The following day, the album received a Japanese release, by Sony Music Japan. Due to DeLuna changing record labels, the album was not released in 2007 in any other territories. However, throughout the spring and summer of 2008, the album was released by Akon's music label Konvict Music.  To make way for this edition in the United States, planned for July 29, 2008, the original album was removed from the U.S. and Japanese iTunes Stores.  Due to the lackluster performance of "Run the Show", however, the re-release in the US never materialized.  The original version remained also in Canada, while the Konvict Music Edition was released across Europe as well as in Australia, New Zealand and Japan (where both versions were released).

Critical reception

Track listing

Original release
All songs are produced by RedOne.

Konvict Musik Edition

Release history

Charts

Weekly charts

Year-end charts

References

2007 debut albums
Kat DeLuna albums
Albums produced by RedOne
Epic Records albums